The fifth-generation iPad Mini (stylized and marketed as iPad mini and colloquially referred to as iPad Mini 5) is a tablet computer in the iPad Mini line, designed, developed and marketed by Apple Inc. Announced in a press release along with the third-generation iPad Air on March 18, 2019 and released the same day, it was the first iPad Mini that was released without a live press event. Its predecessor, the iPad Mini 4, was discontinued on the same day.

It shares a similar design to the iPad Mini 4 and features the Apple A12 Bionic chip, 64 or 256GB storage, a more modernly upgraded 7.9-inch Retina Display with support for Apple Pencil (1st Generation), True Tone display and Bluetooth 5.0. iFixit's teardown shows this iPad Mini is equipped with an upgraded 3GB of LPDDR4X RAM, the same as the iPhone XR. The iPad Mini 5 is the final model with a home button, which has been present on all models since the original in November 2012.

The iPad Mini 5 was discontinued on September 14, 2021, with the announcement of the iPad Mini (6th generation).

Features

Hardware
The design of the fifth-generation iPad Mini is nearly identical to the iPad Mini 4.

Available in three color options (including Silver, Space Gray and Gold), the gold color option of the fifth-generation iPad Mini is now updated introduced with the iPhone 8.

It features the upgraded front camera system of the 7MP (1080p) camera used since 2016 starting with the iPhone 7 and continued with the iPhone XS, while the rear camera system continues with the older 8MP (1080p) used since the iPad Air 2 in 2014, as such, it cannot be recorded in 4K video. The iPad Mini uses a Lightning port and has a headphone jack. It has a True Tone display, which allows the LCD to adapt to ambient lighting to change its color and intensity in different environments. It also has a wide color display (Display P3 color gamut), which means it can shows more vibrant color compared to the previous generation.

The Apple A12 Bionic chip powering the fifth-generation iPad Mini has a 66% higher clock speed than its predecessor, which had a 1.5 GHz dual-core processor; (the Apple A8 in the previous generation was clocked higher than in the iPhone 6). The Apple A12 Bionic chip has a 2.49 GHz six-core processor. The fifth-generation iPad Mini is 3 × faster than the iPad Mini 4, and supports Apple Pencil (1st Generation).

Reception
The Verge rated the Mini 5 as a 8.5 out of 10, praising that it has the same specs as the larger iPad Air and had solid performance while noting that it had a "seven-year-old exterior design with huge bezels" and uses a Lightning port instead of USB-C.

Timeline

References

External links
 – official site

Mini 5
 iOS
Tablet computers
Touchscreen portable media players
Tablet computers introduced in 2019